The 1990–91 FIBA European Cup Winners' Cup was the twenty-fifth edition of FIBA's 2nd-tier level European-wide professional club basketball competition, contested between national domestic cup champions, running from 25 September 1990, to 26 March 1991. It was contested by 19 teams, two less than the previous edition.

PAOK defeated CAI Zaragoza, in the final that was held in Geneva, winning its first European-wide title ever. It was the second Greek League club that won the FIBA Cup Winners' Cup, after AEK Athens won in the distant 1967–68 season.

Participants

First round

|}

Top 16

|}
 The game was held at Peristeri Arena, due to Gulf War.

Quarterfinals

Semifinals

|}

Final
March 26, Patinoire des Vernets, Geneva

|}

References

External links
1990–91 FIBA European Cup Winner's Cup @ linguasport.com
FIBA European Cup Winner's Cup 1990–91
Full Game [VIDEO] @YouTube

FIBA Saporta Cup
FIBA